Veteran Entertainment Television, more commonly referenced as VET Tv, is an American vertically integrated over-the-top media service that specializes in producing and distributing military comedy films and television series whose primary audience is the military and veteran community. VET Tv was founded by Donny O’Malley in June 2016 and is based in San Diego, California.

History
Prior to VET Tv, Donny O’Malley wrote the best seller, “Embarrassing Confessions of a Marine Lieutenant” and started Irreverent Warriors, a non-profit designated as a 501(c)(3) tax-exempt organization by the Internal Revenue Service. O’Malley created original home-made videos to market both ventures and saw an opportunity to create a film production company after receiving feedback from his audience that they would pay for his content.

In July 2016, Donny O’Malley founded VET Tv and based it on the idea of producing micro-budget films made specifically for the veteran and military community “using pitch-black comedy as a tool for processing the horrors of war.” O'Malley claims, “There is tangible proof that healing from the trauma of war can be achieved through comedy." This was O'Malley's goal when he created VET Tv.

VET Tv was first conceptualized in May 2016 and on October 12, 2016, VET Tv launched a crowdfunding campaign on Kickstarter with a goal of $250,000. After 35 days and with the support of 3,609 backers, the campaign raised $296,331, becoming the third highest funded campaign in the Comedy Category, behind Mystery Science Theatre 3000 and Flight of the Conchords.

The company, described as a “ragtag team of aspiring filmmakers”, launched the OTT platform on June 23, 2017.

Programming
In June 2018, VICE investigated VET Tv's mission and audience with interviews of actual veterans as well as a documentary.

During the COVID pandemic there was a 20% increase in veteran suicides. O’Malley discussed in a television interview with KSNV Los Vegas how VET Tv aims to connect with veterans to reduce the effects of isolation due to the pandemic.

VET Tv has also used its programming to point out flaws in the military. In June 2021, V for Valor debuted, a satire which criticizes the military's broken award system.

Filmography
List of VET Tv's original television series and episodes:

 Kill, Die, Laugh (2017)
 The Let Down (2017)
 A Grunt’s Life (2017)
 Department of Offense (2018)
 Meanwhile, in the Barracks (2018)
 Kill, Die, Laugh 2.0 (2018)
 The Shop (2018)
 Checkpoint Charlie (2019)
 Drunken Debriefs (2019)
 Recruiters: Mission First (2019)
Team BAMF (2019)
Combat Sports Network (2019)
The Bet (2019)
Mental Hell and Wellness (2020)
V for Valor (2021)

Mission Statement
VET Tv's mission statement is to make entertainment that recreates and parodies the military experience in order to promote camaraderie and prevent veteran suicide.

References

External links
Official Website

Television networks in the United States
Internet television channels
Military fiction